Andrei Ivanovich Stakenschneider (March 6 [Gregorian], 1802 – August 20 [Gregorian], 1865), also spelled Stackenschneider and Stuckenschneider, was a Russian architect. His eclectic approach and competence in period styles is manifest in ten palaces built to his design in St. Petersburg. He is often credited for turning Russian architecture from Neoclassicism to Romanticism.

Born into a prosperous family, Stakenschneider trained at the Imperial Academy of Arts, helping Auguste de Montferrand to supervise the construction of Saint Isaac's Cathedral. He was a revivalist, finding his inspiration in Greek, Renaissance, Baroque, and Gothic styles. His first independent work was a Neo-Gothic castle at Keila-Joa, a residence of Count Alexander von Benckendorff near Tallinn.

In the late 1830s, Stakenschneider emerged as the chief court architect of Nicholas I of Russia. For this monarch and his children he designed the Mariinsky Palace (1839–44), Nicholas Palace (1853–61), New Michael Palace (1857–61), as well as the Beloselsky-Belozersky Palace (1846–48) for Princess Kochubey. In Peterhof he was responsible for the Farm Palace (1838–55), the Belvedere Palace (1853–56), and numerous garden pavilions.

Stakenschneider refurbished some rooms in the Winter Palace and applied the Greek Revival idioms to the imperial palace in Oreanda, Crimea (1842–52, burnt down 1882).

References 
 Петрова Т.А. А. Штакеншнейдер. Л., 1978.

1802 births
1865 deaths
People from Gatchinsky District
People from Saint Petersburg Governorate
Russian and Soviet-German people
19th-century architects from the Russian Empire